Tropical Storm Allison was a tropical cyclone that produced severe flooding in the southern United States. The second tropical cyclone and the first named storm of the 1989 Atlantic hurricane season, Allison formed on June 24 in the northwestern Gulf of Mexico. Development of Allison was a result of the interaction of a tropical wave and the remnants of Pacific hurricane Hurricane Cosme. It moved south and became a tropical storm on June 26. By June 27, Allison made landfall near Freeport, Texas. Allison quickly weakened to a tropical depression later that day, and transitioned into an extratropical cyclone on the following day. However, the storm's remnants persisted for another 10 days and meandered across the area, triggering flooding across the region, before dissipating on July 7.

In total, 11 fatalities resulted from the storm, as well as $560 million (1989 USD, $  USD) in damage.

Meteorological history

Three meteorological phenomena combined to produce Tropical Storm Allison. First, Hurricane Cosme moved northward through Mexico in response to a strong mid to upper-level ridge. Its remnants entered the Gulf of Mexico on June 22, when a westward moving tropical wave reached the area. Finally, a strong anticyclone over the Gulf allowed for the disturbed area to organize into Tropical Depression Two in the western Gulf of Mexico on June 24.

The depression continued to organize as it drifted to the north, and became Tropical Storm Allison on June 26 off the Texas coast. A ridge to Allison's north weakened in response to an approaching frontal trough, and the tropical storm accelerated to the north. Allison reached a peak of  winds just before hitting near Freeport, Texas on June 27. It turned to the northeast with the front, weakened to a tropical depression on June 27, and became extratropical on June 28.

The frontal trough outran the system, and the building ridge to Allison's north forced the extratropical depression turned to the south and southwest. After executing a cyclonic loop over Texas, the ridge to the north began to erode, allowing Allison to track northeast and out of the state. Its circulation dissipated on July 1, but the remnants retained some organization, and continued to the northeast. On July 3 and July 4, the shortwave that influenced the remnants of Allison accelerated ahead of the storm, causing Allison to become stationary over the borders of Kentucky, Illinois, and Indiana. A second shortwave trough brought the remnants of Allison southward into Alabama. It turned to the northwest, and the remnants of Allison became unidentifiable over Arkansas on July 7.

Preparations
In preparation for Tropical Storm Allison, a tropical storm watch was issued on June 24 for Baffin Bay, Texas to Morgan City, Louisiana. By June 26, this alert was upgraded to a tropical storm warning. All advisories were discontinued the next day.

Impact

Texas
Severe flooding occurred, with more than 6,200 homes suffering water damage, which forced hundreds of residents to evacuate and stranding thousands of other people. Losses in Texas were estimated between $200 million and $400 million. Additionally, there were three deaths in the state, all of which due to drowning. Low-lying areas around the mouth of the Trinity River were completely submerged for several days. 

An estimated  of sand was washed away, while Texas State Highway 87 was closed due to sand and debris spewed onto the roadway from the storm surge. Wind gusts up to  downed some trees limbs and power lines. Additionally, a tornado was spawned in Gilchrist and caused minor damage and one injury. In Hardin County, rains of  fell. The Pine Island Bayou overflowed, flooding homes in Pinewood Estates and Silsbee. 

As a result, significant flooding occurred along the Trinity River. In Liberty and Moss Bluff, Texas, residents of 8 subdivisions were left isolated. Throughout the county, an estimated 2,500 people became stranded. About 3,000 homes were flooded, with 500 people fleeing for higher ground. In Jasper County, precipitation amounts reaching  caused flooding in Buna and Kirbyville, as well as low-lying areas around the Sabine River. Similar amounts of precipitation amounts in Montgomery County caused flooding along the San Jacinto River and Caney and Spring Creeks. The Sabine River also exceeded its banks in Orange County, flooding several homes and streets.

Significant flooding occurred in areas around the Hillebrandt Bayou. About 200 homes and 50 businesses in Beaumont received water damage, with losses estimated nearly $1.5 million. Throughout the county, damage reached about $2.8 million. Two teenage boys drowned in Beaumont, after the raft they were riding on capsized and subsequently swept into a drainage pipe. This caused minor beach erosion in Jefferson County, while portions of Texas State Highway 87 was also closed here due to sand and debris washed onto the roadway.

Elsewhere
The local hardest hit by the flooding was Winnfield, Louisiana, which experienced almost  of rain from June 26 to July 1.

Rainfall from the storm extended eastward into the Mid-Atlantic States, producing flooding. In Delaware, the rainfall led to record breaking discharge rates at three gauging stations, while one-third of the state's gauging stations reported significant discharges.

 of rain fell at a site in Arkansas, the highest rainfall total from a tropical cyclone in the state.

Eleven people were reported killed from the storm. Three deaths occurred in Texas, five in Mississippi and three in Louisiana. Two teenage boys were killed when their raft got sucked into a drainage pipe from the runoff of Allison in Beaumont, Texas. An eighteen-year-old was killed in Harris County, Texas from drowning during a swim. The eight final deaths in Louisiana and Mississippi were by drowning. The extreme flooding in turn led to heavy damage, amounting to around $560 million (1989 USD).

See also

 List of tropical storms named Allison
 List of wettest tropical cyclones in the United States
 List of Texas hurricanes (1980–present)
 Tropical Storm Allison (2001)
 Hurricane Harvey (2017)
 Tropical Storm Imelda (2019)

References

External links

NHC Allison Report

Allison
Allison 1989
Allison 1989
Allison 1989
Allison 1989
Allison 1989
1989 natural disasters in the United States
Allison 1989